William Howard Thompson (October 14, 1871February 9, 1928) was a United States senator from Kansas.

Biography
Born in Crawfordsville, Indiana, he moved with his parents to Nemaha County, Kansas in 1880, where attended the public schools and graduated from the Seneca Normal School in 1886. He graduated from the Lawrence Business College in 1891. He was the official court reporter of the twenty-second judicial district of Kansas from 1891 to 1894, and studied law; he was admitted to the bar in 1894, commencing practice in Seneca; he was clerk of the Kansas Court of Appeals in Topeka and practiced law there from 1897 to 1901.

He moved to Iola, Kansas in 1901 and continued the practice of law. He was county attorney of Allen County and moved to Garden City in 1905. From 1906 to 1913 he was judge of the thirty-second judicial district of Kansas. In 1912, he was elected to the U.S. Senate, and resigned his judgeship in 1913; he served from March 4, 1913, to March 3, 1919, and was an unsuccessful candidate for reelection to the U.S. Senate in 1918. He was defeated by 30 percentage points, the largest loss ever by a sitting U.S. senator not running as a third-party candidate. 

Thompson resumed the practice of law at Kansas City, Kansas in 1919 and moved to Tulsa, Oklahoma in 1923, and practiced law in Kansas City and Tulsa. He moved to Washington, D.C., in 1927, where he continued the practice of law, and died there in 1928, aged 56.  He was interred temporarily in Glenwood cemetery in Washington, DC; in May 1928 his remains were transferred to Mount Hope cemetery in Topeka, Kansas.

Electoral history

Senator of Kansas

References

 

1871 births
1928 deaths
People from Crawfordsville, Indiana
Democratic Party United States senators from Kansas
Kansas Democrats
Kansas state court judges
People from Kansas City, Kansas
Politicians from Topeka, Kansas
People from Nemaha County, Kansas